The Hong Kong Island by-election, 2000 was held on 10 December 2000, when then Democratic Alliance for the Betterment of Hong Kong (DAB) vice-chairman Gary Cheng declined to accept his seat as a result of a scandal. Audrey Eu, who was then running as an independent backed by the pro-democracy camp won the by-election with 52.1% of valid vote. Cheng was subsequently jailed for abuse of office.

Result

References 

2000 elections in China
2000 in Hong Kong
2000